Eochaid mac Áeda Find is a supposed King of Dál Riata found in some rare High Medieval king-lists and in older history books.

Supposedly a son of Áed Find (died 778) and successor to Áed's brother Fergus mac Echdach.

References
 Broun, Dauvit, The Irish Identity of the Kingdom of the Scots in the Twelfth and Thirteenth Centuries. Boydell, Woodbridge, 1999. 
 Broun, Dauvit, "Pictish Kings 761–839: Integration with Dál Riata or Separate Development" in Sally M. Foster (ed.), The St Andrews Sarcophagus: A Pictish masterpiece and its international connections. Four Courts, Dublin, 1998. 

Kings of Dál Riata